"Down the Street to 301" is a song originally recorded by Johnny Cash. It was written for him by Jack Clement.

The song was recorded by Cash on July 17, 1958 during his final session for Sun Records (or on May 15) and released as a single (Sun 343, with "The Story of a Broken Heart" on the opposite side) in June 1960.

Background 
According to John M. Alexander's book The Man in Song: A Discographic Biography of Johnny Cash, the song was written by Charlie Rich and wasn't released as a single:

Charts

References 

Johnny Cash songs
1960 singles
Songs written by Jack Clement
Sun Records singles
1960 songs